Berolina (minor planet designation: 422 Berolina) is a typical Main belt asteroid.

It was discovered by G. Witt on 8 October 1896 in Berlin. It was first of his two asteroid discoveries. The other was the famous asteroid 433 Eros.

Although it has an orbit similar to the Flora family asteroids, it appears to be an unrelated interloper due to not being of the S spectral type (see the PDS asteroid taxonomy data set).

References

External links
 
 

Background asteroids
Berolina
Berolina
DX-type asteroids (Tholen)
18961008